Román Marcelo Cuello Arizmendi (born 4 April 1977 in Santa Lucía) is a Uruguayan football manager and former player who played as a forward.

Coaching career
In December 2019, Cuello was appointed manager of Liverpool Montevideo.

Azerbaijan Career statistics

References

External links

1977 births
Living people
Uruguayan footballers
Uruguayan expatriate footballers
Uruguay international footballers
Uruguayan Primera División players
China League One players
Azerbaijan Premier League players
Racing Club de Montevideo players
Montevideo Wanderers F.C. players
C.A. Cerro players
Nanjing Yoyo players
Miramar Misiones players
Club Alianza Lima footballers
Defensor Sporting players
Deportes Melipilla footballers
Rangers de Talca footballers
Cobresal footballers
Shamakhi FK players
Club Deportivo Palestino footballers
Centro Atlético Fénix players
Boston River players
Rampla Juniors players
Expatriate footballers in Chile
Expatriate footballers in Peru
Expatriate footballers in China
Expatriate footballers in Ecuador
Expatriate footballers in Azerbaijan
Uruguayan Primera División managers
Montevideo City Torque managers

Association football forwards
Montevideo Wanderers managers
Liverpool F.C. (Montevideo) managers